
Malaipaṭukaṭām is an ancient Tamil poem in the Pattuppāṭṭu anthology of the Sangam literature. Authored by Perunkunrur Perunkaucikanar, it consists of 583 lines that describe the nature scenes, the people and the culture of mountain countryside under king Nannan. The poem is dated approximately to 210 CE by Kamil Zvelebil – a Tamil literature scholar.

The title of the poem Malaipatukatam, also spelled Malaipadukadam, is found in lines 347–348 of the poem in the context of "roaring elephants in rut". The title has been interpreted in two ways. Some scholars translate it as "the secretion oozing from the mountains", while others as "the sound of katam which arises in the mountains". Either is metonymically interpreted as "the Echo of the Mountains". The poem is also known as Kūttarāṟṟupaṭai (Kuttararruppatai), lit. "Guide to the Dancing Minstrels", a title that suggests that it is an arruppatai-genre poem.

The Malaipatukatam is known for its similes, some of which are also found in other Sangam poems. It paints a vivid picture of the hilly region (near Chengam, then called Chenkama), the people, the troupes of actors and their musical instruments. The poem describes the beauty of the female singers and dancers. Other lines present the valor of virtues king Nannan. His capital city is described, along with a long catalog-like description of the birds, animals, trees, flowers, and fruits found in the hilly kingdom. 

The guide outlines some natural dangers faced by troupes as they travel from one performance site to another, and the generous hospitality they will receive from villagers along their way. It mentions servings of alcohol made from rice that is aged in bamboos, a meal of rice, buttermilk, avarai beans and tamarind gravy. A few lines in the Malaipatukatam mention the shepherds, the fishermen and the farmers along the Cheyyar River (Seyaru). The women in these regions, states the poem, sing songs as they pound and husk the grains.

The lengthy poem mentions the Hindu god Vishnu primarily though there are also references to Shiva, his son Murugan – the god of war (line 651), and the king as Shiva's devotee. The poem alludes to the "great god" and "god who drank poison" (likely Shiva) and pillars that were worshipped (likely lingam). The Malaipatukatam uses the word ool (Sanskrit: karma). It also mentions the goddess of wealth, Lakshmi in lines 463–464 and the "god on whose breast she sits enthroned".

See also
 Chera dynasty
 Sangam literature

Notes

References

Bibliography

 
 Mudaliyar, Singaravelu A., Apithana Cintamani, An encyclopaedia of Tamil Literature, (1931) - Reprinted by Asian Educational Services, New Delhi (1983)
 
 
 Selby, Martha Ann (2011) Tamil Love Poetry: The Five Hundred Short Poems of the Aiṅkuṟunūṟu, an Early Third-Century Anthology. Columbia University Press,